Borduas is a provincial electoral district in Quebec.

Borduas may also refer to:
 Chambly—Borduas, a federal electoral district in Quebec

People with the surname
 Paul-Émile Borduas, Canadian abstract painter